Jiří Šulc (born 1969) is a Czech writer.

After graduating from the Faculty of Law of Charles University in Prague, he worked for the Security Information Service for fifteen years. Later he worked for the European Commission in Brussels. He currently works at the European GNSS Agency in Prague.

He won the Book Club Literary Prize in 2007 for his literary debut written on the assassination of Reinhard Heydrich, the novel Dva proti Říši (literally Two Men Against the Empire).

He wrote his first two novels in English, translating them to Czech after not finding a publisher for them.

Works 
 Dva proti Říši (2007)
 published in English as ebook Hunting the Predator in 2016
 Operace Bruneval (2008)
 Mosty do Tel-Avivu (2010)
 Operace Stonewall (2011)
 Zrádci (2012)

References 

Living people
1969 births
Czech writers
21st-century male writers
Charles University alumni